Naik Neeraj Kumar Singh, AC was a Non Commissioned Officer (NCO) in the Indian Army who was posthumously awarded the Ashok Chakra, the country’s highest peacetime military decoration on 26 January 2015. He had enlisted in the 13th battalion, Rajputana Rifles and was serving in the 57th battalion Rashtriya Rifles when he was martyred in action.

The Army man, while leading a search operation at Kupwara in Jammu & Kashmir on August 24, 2014, came under heavy fire from terrorists. He rescued an injured Army person and shot dead one of the terrorists.

Early life 
Naik Neeraj Kumar Singh hailed from Devrala village in Bulandshahar district of Uttar Pradesh. He was the son of  Shri Omvir Singh and Shrimati Rajas. His father was a farmer. He had three more siblings.

Military career 
Neeraj Kumar Singh had enlisted in the 13 Battalion of Rajputana Rifles in  Indian Army . He was deputed to serve in the 57 Battalion of the Rashtriya Rifles for anti-terrorist operations after serving for in his regiment. For his bravery, courage and self sacrifice he was posthumously awarded Ashoka Chakra, India's highest peacetime gallantry award.

Ashoka Chakra awardee 

He was awarded India's Highest Peacetime Gallantry Award- Ashoka Chakra on 26 January 2015, Republic Day. His award citation reads:

Personal life 
He loved his military life. He even wished that his two sons Kunal and Lovepita could also become army officers. Naik Neeraj Kumar is survived by his parents, wife Parameshwari and two sons, Kunal and Lovepita.

References

External links
 

Recipients of the Ashoka Chakra (military decoration)
2014 deaths
Indian Army personnel
Year of birth missing
Ashoka Chakra